Strange Tales is a Marvel Comics anthology series title that appeared and was revived in different forms on multiple occasions throughout the company's history.

Strange Tales may also refer to:

 Strange Tales (album), an album by The Humans
 Strange Tales, a Pink Floyd bootleg recording
 Strange Tales (digest magazine), a British science fiction magazine
 Strange Tales (pulp magazine), an American fantasy fiction magazine